China from Above is a Chinese-American documentary television series premiered on September 24, 2015, on National Geographic Channel. It was produced by National Geographic Channel and the China Intercontinental Communication Center. The broadcast is narrated by Andres Williams. The documentary consists of two episodes, episode one features China's ancient civilization with a fascinating history dating back thousands of years; episode two takes to the air to reveal how modern China lives, eats, works, travels, and plays on a mega scale.

Episodes

References

External links
 China from Above - video Netease
 China from Above - video Tencent

2015 Chinese television series debuts
2015 American television series debuts
National Geographic (American TV channel) original programming